The Faroe Islands Cup 2006 was played between March 18 and October 14, 2006. The cup was won by B36 Tórshavn.

Only first teams of Faroese football clubs were allowed to participate. The First Round involves teams from the second and third deild. Teams from the highest two divisions enter the competition in the 2nd Round.

First round

Second round

Quarterfinals

Semifinals

First legs

Second legs

Final

Top goalscorers

See also
Faroe Islands Super Cup

References

Faroe Islands Cup seasons
Cup